Frederick Joseph is an American author. In 2020, he published The New York Times bestseller,The Black Friend, a social justice book aimed at younger readers based on his own experiences as Black youth in Westchester County, New York and subsequent college years. He has been published on the topics of marketing, culture, and politics in various publications including HuffPost, USA Today, NowThisNews, and The Independent. Joseph also received media attention for a fundraising initiative for rent relief program in the early months of the COVID-19 pandemic.

In 2019, Joseph was named in the Forbes 30 Under 30 list for marketing and advertising. Joseph was also honored with the 2018 Comic-con Humanitarian of the Year Award and was a member of the 2018 The Root 100 List of Most Influential African Americans.  He has been featured over 2,000 times in the media for his work, including Business Insider, Vogue, The Oscars, Ellen, CNN, Good Morning America, and iHeart Media.

Books

The Black Friend: On Being A Better White Person 
In December 2020, Candlewick Press released Frederick Joseph's first book, The Black Friend: On Being A Better White Person. Joseph decided to write this young adult book after reflecting on daily microaggressions throughout his life. Writing from the perspective of a friend, Joseph offers candid reflections on his own experiences with racism, as well as conversations with prominent artists and activists about theirs. The Black Friend encourages White people to be thoughtful of their interactions with people of color. It is a guide for those who want to do better. The book discusses racism and social injustice and teaches awareness and knowledge to help people become antiracist. It includes personal experiences, interviews, references to pop culture and media, and an interactive encyclopedia of racism. Despite limited marketing and no book tour due to the COVID-19 pandemic, The Black Friend: On Being a Better White Person, became an instant New York Times Best Seller.

Patriarchy Blues: Reflections on Manhood 
In Spring 2022, Harper Perennial will publish Frederick's second book, Patriarchy Blues: Reflections on Manhood, which examines the culture of masculinity from the perspective of a Black man. It includes a collection of essays, poems, and short reflections on the concept of toxic masculinity and the experiences of men, particularly those of color. Joseph's personal and cultural standpoints on fatherhood, stereotypes, and what it means to be a man were his inspiration for this book. This autobiography discusses topics related to misogyny, homophobia, transphobia, and more.

Better Than We Found It: Conversations to Help Save The World 
In Fall 2022, Candlewick Press will publish Frederick's next book, Better Than We Found It: Conversations to Help Save The World, which is coauthored by Porsche Joseph. This young adult nonfiction serves as a guide to social and political progressivism, and covers issues related to climate change, health care, economic inequality, gun violence and more.

Activism 
Frederick has raised more than $1.5 million dollars for various causes through GoFundMe and consults with large corporate clients on philanthropic efforts.

Philanthropy
In 2018, Frederick Joseph launched the #BlackPantherChallenge on GoFundMe in an effort to promote representation and inclusion by raising more than $1 million globally for 73 thousand children of color to see the movie at no cost. His successful fundraising efforts led to an umbrella campaign that resulted in the biggest entertainment-related GoFundMe in history. The campaign tripled its goal in 10 days and included support from public figures such as Chelsea Clinton, J.J. Abrams, and Jemele Hill. He also founded We Have Stories, a nonprofit marketing and fundraising agency that provides financial grants for those focused on representation and inclusion.

In 2019, Frederick launched the #CaptainMarvelChallenge in partnership with Girls Inc. which raised more than $60 thousand for little girls to see the female led film through his non-profit, We Have Stories.

In 2020, during the coronavirus pandemic, Frederick Joseph launched the #RentRelief campaign on GoFundMe and transferred cash to people directly via PayPal, Venmo, or other cash apps. Due to unemployment, delayed stimulus checks, and unexpected bills, Frederick distributed $200 payments to whoever needed it. He also raised and donated $40,000 to New York City's food bank in the absence of government aid since the pandemic-related layoffs began.

Personal life 
Joseph was born and raised in Yonkers, New York. He cites his maternal grandmother, Thelma Ford, as one of his writing inspirations, who wrote short stories. Ford strived to become a published author, but was unable to due to obstacles in place for Black women in poverty in the 1930's and 1940's.

Joseph graduated from Hunter College in 2012 with a degree in Political science and Creative Writing.

After graduating, Joseph worked in copy editing and marketing, leading into a career of progressive writing, activism, and becoming a New York Times Bestselling author.

In 2018, Joseph became engaged to writer Porsche Landon after two years of dating. They live in Queens, New York with their dog Stokely.

Ideas, Influences, and Political Stances

Racial Issues 
Frederick Joseph frequently discusses racial issues and calls out the absence of accountability. In a discussion with Forbes about social media's anti-blackness, he states that the "algorithms were designed by White engineers with White individuals in mind" and that White consumers are "upholding systems of inequity." He has also partnered with Yahoo Life on the Allyship Pledge program to help readers recognize systems of oppression and become accomplices rather than allys. His book, The Black Friend, discusses painful racist moments and acts as a tool for White people to better understand problematic behavior. He has also raised nearly $1 million to send more than 73 thousand kids to see the movie "Black Panther" in an effort to promote representation and inclusion.

Women's Rights 
Frederick's non-profit, We Have Stories, provides financial grants to help increase positive representation of minority groups in the media, and Girls Inc. LA. His GoFundMe Captain Marvel Challenge raised money for young girls to see the female led film. Frederick believes that, "Everyone should have an opportunity to see women in roles they can aspire to one day be, roles that show women as strong, smart, and bold."

Awards and recognition 

 International Literacy Association (ILA) Children's and Young Adult's Book Award
 2021 Bank Street College Best Children’s Book of The Year
 2021 Cooperative Children's Book Center Choices Book List
 2021 In the Margins Book Award
 2020 New York Times Bestselling Author
 2019 Forbes 30 Under 30 for Marketing and Advertising
 Comic-Con Humanitarian of the Year
 The Root 100 List of Most Influential African Americans

Bibliography

Adult Non-Fiction 

 Patriarchy Blues: Reflections On Manhood (2022)

Young Adult Non-Fiction 

 The Black Friend: On Being a Better White Person (2020) 
 Better Than We Found It: Conversations to Help Save The World (2022)

References

External links
 

American writers
Year of birth missing (living people)
Living people